Stedten is a village and a former municipality in the Mansfeld-Südharz district, Saxony-Anhalt, Germany. Since 1 January 2010, it is part of the municipality Seegebiet Mansfelder Land.

History
The first documented mention of Stedten was as the tithable place Stedi in the Hersfeld Tithe Register, dating from between 881 and 889.

Former municipalities in Saxony-Anhalt
Seegebiet Mansfelder Land